Calhoun Township is one of sixteen townships in Calhoun County, Iowa, United States.  As of the 2000 census, its population was 166.

History
Calhoun Township was the first township created in 1856. It originally included the entire county.

Geography
According to the USGS, it contains one cemetery, Bishop.

References

External links
 City-Data.com

Townships in Calhoun County, Iowa
Townships in Iowa